Pist-e Abali (also Romanized as Pīst-e Āb‘alī; also known as Pīst-e Eskī-ye Āb‘alī) is a village in Abali Rural District, Rudehen District, Damavand County, Tehran Province, Iran. At the 2006 census, its population was 20, in 8 families.

References 

Populated places in Damavand County